A gubernatorial election was held on 9 April 1995 to elect the Governor of Hokkaido Prefecture.

Candidates
Tatsuya Hori - Vice-Governor of Hokkaido, age 59.
 - member of the House of Representatives, age 51.
Yūichirō Miura - skier and alpinist, age 62.
, age 48.
, age 59.

Results

References

Hokkaido gubernational elections
1995 elections in Japan